In mathematics, a Niemeier lattice is one of the 24 
positive definite even unimodular lattices of rank 24,
One example of a Niemeier lattice is the Leech lattice.

Classification 
Niemeier lattices are usually labelled by the Dynkin diagram of their
root systems.  These Dynkin diagrams have rank either 0 or 24, and all of their components have the same Coxeter number. (The Coxeter number, at least in these cases,  is 
the number of roots divided by the dimension.) There are exactly 24 Dynkin diagrams with these properties, and there turns out to be a unique Niemeier
lattice for each of these Dynkin diagrams.

The complete list of Niemeier lattices is given in the following table.
In the table, 
G0 is the order of the group generated by reflections
G1 is the order of the group of automorphisms fixing all components of the Dynkin diagram
G2 is the order of the group of automorphisms of permutations of components of the Dynkin diagram
G∞ is the index of the root lattice in the Niemeier lattice, in other words, the order of the "glue code". It is the square root of the discriminant of the root lattice.
G0×G1×G2 is the order of the automorphism group of the lattice
G∞×G1×G2 is the order of the automorphism group of the corresponding deep hole.

The neighborhood graph of the Niemeier lattices
If L is an odd unimodular lattice of dimension 8n and M its sublattice of even vectors, then M is contained in exactly 3 unimodular lattices, one of which is L and the other two of which are even. (If L has a norm 1 vector then the two even lattices are isomorphic.) The Kneser neighborhood graph in 8n dimensions has a point for each even lattice, and a line joining two points for each odd 8n dimensional lattice with no norm 1 vectors, where the vertices of each line are the two even lattices associated to the odd lattice. There may be several lines between the same pair of vertices, and there may be lines from a vertex to itself. Kneser proved that this graph  is always connected. In 8 dimensions it has one point and no lines, in 16 dimensions it has two points joined by one line, and in 24 dimensions it is the following graph:

Each point represents one of the 24 Niemeier lattices, and the lines joining them represent the 24 dimensional odd unimodular lattices with no norm 1 vectors. (Thick lines represent multiple lines.) The number on the right is the Coxeter number of the Niemeier lattice.

In 32 dimensions the neighborhood graph has more than a billion vertices.

Properties 
Some of the Niemeier lattices are related to sporadic simple groups. 
The Leech lattice is acted  on by a double cover of the Conway group, 
and the lattices A124 and A212
are acted on by the Mathieu groups M24 and M12.

The Niemeier lattices, other than the Leech lattice, correspond to 
the deep holes of the Leech lattice. This implies that the affine Dynkin diagrams of the Niemeier lattices can be seen inside the Leech lattice, when 
two points of the Leech lattice are joined by no lines when they have distance
, by 1 line if they have distance ,
and by a double line if they have distance .

Niemeier lattices also correspond to the 24 orbits of primitive norm zero vectors w of the even unimodular Lorentzian lattice II25,1, where the Niemeier lattice corresponding to w is w⊥/w.

See also 

 Umbral moonshine
 Smith Minkowski Siegel mass formula#Dimension n = 24

References

 English translation in

External links 
 Aachen University lattice catalogue

Quadratic forms
Lattice points